Samuel Raymond Bennion (1 September 1896 – 12 March 1968) was a Welsh footballer who played as a right-half in the Football League in the 1920s and 1930s. In his early life, he played for Gwersyllt School. He then had spells at Ragtimes and Crichton's Athletic, with whom he won the Cheshire County Challenge Cup before joining Manchester United in April 1921. His debut for United came on 27 August 1921 against Everton at Goodison Park. After scoring three goals in 301 appearances for the club, he moved to Burnley in November 1932, and was appointed as a coach there two years later. He was capped 10 times for Wales, and made his debut for them on 31 October 1925 against Scotland at Ninian Park. In 1964, he retired due to ill health.

References
Bibliography

Notes

1896 births
1968 deaths
Welsh footballers
Association football wing halves
Wales international footballers
English Football League players
Burnley F.C. players
Manchester United F.C. players